The Players Tour Championship 2010/2011 – Event 6 (also known as Star Xing Pai Players Tour Championship 2010/2011 – Event 6 for sponsorship purposes) was a professional minor-ranking snooker tournament that took place over 14–17 October 2010 at the World Snooker Academy in Sheffield, England.

Dominic Dale won his third professional title by defeating Martin Gould 4–3 in the final.

Prize fund and ranking points
The breakdown of prize money and ranking points of the event is shown below:

1 Only professional players can earn ranking points.

Main draw

Preliminary round
Best of 7 frames

Main rounds

Top half

Section 1

Section 2

Section 3

Section 4

Bottom half

Section 5

Section 6

Section 7

Section 8

Finals

Century breaks

 142, 113, 105  Matthew Stevens
 138  Xiao Guodong
 137, 103, 102  Andy Hicks
 136, 127  Dominic Dale
 135, 102  Ding Junhui
 133  Neil Robertson
 132  Chen Zhe
 132  Daniel Wells
 131, 110  Liang Wenbo
 128  Anthony McGill
 125  Marco Fu
 122, 108  Judd Trump
 120  Andrew Higginson
 117  Barry Hawkins
 116  Mark Selby

 115  Stuart Carrington
 113  Rod Lawler
 113  Jimmy White
 112  James McBain
 111  Alan McManus
 107  Adrian Gunnell
 104  Jamie Burnett
 103, 102  Adam Wicheard
 103  Liam Highfield
 103  Jimmy Robertson
 103  Liu Song
 101  Robert Milkins
 101  Simon Bedford
 101  David Grace
 101  Mark Allen

References

6
2010 in English sport

sv:Players Tour Championship 2010/2011#Players Tour Championship 6